Forksburg is an unincorporated community in Marion County, West Virginia, United States. Its post office is closed.

Notable person
Ephraim F. Morgan - former Governor of West Virginia.

References 

Unincorporated communities in West Virginia
Unincorporated communities in Marion County, West Virginia